Franciszków may refer to the following places:
Franciszków, Kutno County in Łódź Voivodeship (central Poland)
Franciszków, Krasnystaw County in Lublin Voivodeship (east Poland)
Franciszków, Lublin County in Lublin Voivodeship (east Poland)
Franciszków, Pabianice County in Łódź Voivodeship (central Poland)
Franciszków, Skierniewice County in Łódź Voivodeship (central Poland)
Franciszków, Świdnik County in Lublin Voivodeship (east Poland)
Franciszków, Gmina Chynów in Masovian Voivodeship (east-central Poland)
Franciszków, Gmina Jasieniec in Masovian Voivodeship (east-central Poland)
Franciszków, Radom County in Masovian Voivodeship (east-central Poland)
Franciszków, Wołomin County in Masovian Voivodeship (east-central Poland)
Franciszków, Żyrardów County in Masovian Voivodeship (east-central Poland)